ChannelAdvisor Corp. is an e-commerce company based in Morrisville, North Carolina which provides provides cloud-based e-commerce software. Until 2022, it was traded on the New York Stock Exchange under the symbol ECOM. 

On November 15, 2022, the company was acquired by CommerceHub.

History and operations
Scott Wingo and Aris Banevicius founded the company in 2001. Today, Wingo is a member of the Board of Directors at ChannelAdvisor, and after serving as Chief Technology Officer. Buinevicius retired from the company on March 17, 2017.

Prior to launching ChannelAdvisor, Wingo and Buinevicius co-founded Stingray Software as well as AuctionRover.com, an auction search site. Auctionrover.com was acquired by GoTo.com, becoming GoTo Auctions.

ChannelAdvisor filed for initial public offering on April 11, 2013 and went public on May 23, 2013.

From 2007 to 2017, ChannelAdvisor hosted an annual e-commerce industry conference called Catalyst, in both the U.S. and Europe. The company launched a new annual event called Connect in 2019.

From 2010 to 2020, the company’s revenue increased from $36.7 million to $145.1 million.  In 2018, ChannelAdvisor customers processed more than $10 billion in gross merchandise value (GMV).

In addition to headquarters in Morrisville, NC, ChannelAdvisor also has offices in Denver, London, Paris, Southend-on-Sea, Ireland, Australia, Spain, and Germany.

Acquisitions 
The following is a list of acquisitions by ChannelAdvisor:
BlueBoard (July 2020)
HubLogix (May 2017)
E-Tale (November 2014)
RichFX (March 2008)
SearchMarketing (July 2005)

References

External links
 Official Website
 Bloomberg Businessweek’s Company Profile on ChannelAdvisor

Software companies based in North Carolina
Software companies established in 2001
Companies listed on the New York Stock Exchange
Defunct software companies of the United States
2022 mergers and acquisitions